Parabothus is a genus of fish in the family Bothidae native to the Indian and Pacific Ocean.

Species
There are currently 10 recognized species in this genus:
 Parabothus amaokai Parin, 1983
 Parabothus budkeri (Chabanaud, 1943)
 Parabothus chlorospilus (C. H. Gilbert, 1905)
 Parabothus coarctatus (C. H. Gilbert, 1905)
 Parabothus filipes Amaoka, Mihara & Rivaton, 1997
 Parabothus kiensis (S. Tanaka (I), 1918)
 Parabothus malhensis (Regan, 1908)
 Parabothus polylepis (Alcock, 1889) (Many-scaled flounder)
 Parabothus rotundifrons Voronina, Pruvost & Causse, 2017 
 Parabothus taiwanensis Amaoka & S. C. Shen, 1993

References

Bothidae
Ray-finned fish genera
Taxa named by John Roxborough Norman